3568 ASCII, provisional designation , is a dark background asteroid from the outer regions of the asteroid belt, approximately  in diameter. It was discovered on 17 October 1936, by French astronomer Marguerite Laugier at the Nice Observatory in southwestern France. In 1988, the D-type asteroid was named after both the computer character code ASCII and the Japanese computer magazine with the same name.

Orbit and classification 

ASCII is a non-family asteroid from the main belt's background population. It orbits the Sun in the outer main-belt at a distance of 2.4–3.9 AU once every 5 years and 7 months (2,044 days; semi-major axis of 3.15 AU). Its orbit has an eccentricity of 0.24 and an inclination of 19° with respect to the ecliptic.

Physical characteristics 

ASCII has an absolute magnitude of 11.8. Based on the Moving Object Catalog (MOC) of the Sloan Digital Sky Survey, the body has a spectral type of a very dark D-type asteroid, typically found in the outer main-belt and numerous among the Jupiter trojans. As of 2018, no rotational lightcurve of this asteroid has been obtained from photometric observations. The body's rotation period, pole and shape remain unknown.

Diameter and albedo 

According to the survey carried out by the NEOWISE mission of NASA's Wide-field Infrared Survey Explorer, ASCII measures 23.752 kilometers in diameter and its surface has an albedo of 0.045.

Naming 

This minor planet was named after the acronym for American Standard Code for Information Interchange, ASCII, a computer character code and the name of a major Japanese magazine on microcomputers. The name was proposed by Syuichi Nakano, who identified this asteroid during his stay at the Smithsonian Astrophysical Observatory; a stay which was partially funded by articles he wrote for the principal Japanese ASCII magazine. The official naming citation was published by the Minor Planet Center on 2 April 1988.

References

External links 
 Dictionary of Minor Planet Names, Google books
 Discovery Circumstances: Numbered Minor Planets (1)-(5000) – Minor Planet Center
 
 

003568
Discoveries by Marguerite Laugier
Named minor planets
19361017